Mona Abou Hamze ( Abu Alwan; October 2, 1968) is a Lebanese TV personality and presenter, born in Barouk into a Lebanese Druze family. She is best known for her role in hosting the Lebanese show Talk of the Town on MTV, a position she has held since April 2009. On Talk of the Town, Abou Hamze frequently hosts well-known figures, with over 2000 guests to date, from different backgrounds and cultures. The guest list includes celebrities such as politicians, singers, actors, painters, athletes and the like, tapping into the latest social and humanitarian issues.

Education

Career 
Abou Hamze's passion for television stemmed from early on. Concurrently, on a professional level, Abou Hamze was chosen to be a jury member on Mouzii el Arab, the only Pan-Arab TV Show that is solely dedicated to choose future TV presenters, which first aired in 2015 on Abu Dhabi TV and Al Hayat TV station. Other jury members include the famous Laila Elwi and Tony Khalife. Season 2 is expected to air in September 2016.

Abou Hamze is also a member of the Jury of Celebrity Duets (Arabic version) which is broadcast on MTV and MBC, working alongside musicians Oussama Rahbani and Tarek Abou Jaoude, then Simon Asmar.

Abou Hamze's other engagements include being the brand ambassador of Persil, a Henkel product, since 2010.

Awards 
She was the recipient of the Murex d'Or award in 2009 for her show Talk of the Town. In terms of recognition for her presenting skills, Abou Hamze won the Melody Award for Best Presenter for 3 consecutive years, from 2009 to 2011 (until the station, Melody Lebanon was closed down); as well as the Zahret Al Khaleej Award, for the Best Arab Presenter in 2011. She also received accolades from Delta and Al Noujoum Radio stations.

In 2012, Abou Hamze was recognized as one of the ‘100 Most Powerful Arab Women’ in 2012, by CEO Middle East magazine. The issue described her as “A pop culture superstar, Mona Abou Hamze is known for her intelligence, charming maturity, and elegant beauty.”  On a global scale, in 2013, Abou Hamze was the first and only Arab presenter to be officially invited to Cannes Film Festival, which she attended.

Personal life 
She is married to Bahij Abou Hamze, with whom she has two sons and one daughter. Her husband was held under suspicion in 2014, following a lawsuit complaint by Walid Jumblatt then eventually released in 2017 with no charges at all.

Publications 
Abou Hamze is known as a published poet of the book entitled Bila Hakaeb.

References 

1972 births
Living people
Lebanese women television presenters
Lebanese Druze
Lebanese television presenters
American University of Beirut alumni
People from Chouf District
Lebanese women writers